Wang Hao (born October 1963) is a Chinese politician who is the current acting governor of Zhejiang, in office since September 30, 2021. Wang entered the workforce in July 1982, and joined the Chinese Communist Party in January 1984.

Biography
Wang was born in Shan County, Shandong, in October 1963. In October 1980, Wang was accepted to Heze Normal Collage, where he majored in politics. 

From July 1982 to September 2012, he assumed various posts in his home-county and home-city, including head of the Propaganda Department of the CPC Cao County Committee and a member of the Standing Committee of CPC Cao County Committee, and Deputy Communist Party Secretary. From December 2010 to September 2012, he served as Deputy Communist Party Secretary of Binzhou for a short time. In September 2012, he was promoted to Deputy Secretary-General of CPC Shandong Provincial Committee and head of Shandong Provincial Letters and Complaints Bureau. He was head of Shandong Provincial Bureau of Civil Affairs in March 2014, a position he held until February 2015, when he was transferred to Zibo and was promoted again to become Communist Party Secretary and chairman of the Standing Committee of its Municipal People's Congress. Two years later, Wang was transferred again to Yantai and appointed Communist Party Secretary there. 

Wang was Communist Party Secretary of Tangshan and a member of the Standing Committee of CPC Hebei Provincial Committee in December 2017, and held that offices until August 2019.

On September 3, 2019, Wang was appointed Communist Party Secretary of Xi'an, Shaanxi province, after 190 days vacancy of that position.

On September 30, 2021, he was transferred to north China's Zhejiang province and appointed acting governor.

He was a delegate to the 19th National Congress of the Chinese Communist Party.

On October 22, 2022, Wang was elected to the 20th Central Committee of the Communist Party.

References

1963 births
Politicians from Heze
Living people
People's Republic of China politicians from Shandong
Chinese Communist Party politicians from Shandong
Communist Party secretaries of Xi'an